Take My Breath Away is the second studio album by Brazilian DJ and producer Gui Boratto. It was released on German label Kompakt, with an internet release on February 23, 2009, a US release on March 3, and a UK release on March 9.

Track listing 
 Take My Breath Away  - 06:45 
 Atomic Soda  - 08:48 
 Colors - 04:00 
 Opus 17 - 06:59 
 No Turning Back - 07:45 
 Azurra - 04:59 
 Les Enfants - 04:05 
 Besides - 04:18 
 Ballroom - 09:07 
 Eggplant - 06:50 
 Godet - 04:13

Charts 
 91 - Belgium (Flanders) Albums Chart
 131 - France Albums Chart

References

External links 
 

2009 albums
Gui Boratto albums
Kompakt albums